In the United Kingdom, the term listed building refers to a building or other structure officially designated as being of special architectural, historical, or cultural significance; Grade II* structures are those considered to be "particularly important buildings of more than special interest". Listing was begun by a provision in the Town and Country Planning Act 1947. Once listed, strict limitations are imposed on the modifications allowed to a building's structure or fittings. In Wales, the authority for listing under the Planning (Listed Buildings and Conservation Areas) Act 1990 rests with Cadw.

Buildings
Note: for technical reasons, the grid references in the following table are only displayed as text, not as links as in other articles in this series.

|}

Notes

See also

 Grade I listed buildings in Powys
 Scheduled monuments in Powys
 Registered historic parks and gardens in Powys

References

External links

 
Powys II*